Flakea is a genus of lichenized fungi in the family Verrucariaceae. It is a monotypic genus, containing the single species Flakea papillata.

References

Verrucariales
Lichen genera
Monotypic Eurotiomycetes genera
Taxa described in 1992